Mate Maras (born 2 April 1939) is a Croatian translator. He has translated many famous classical and contemporary works from English, Italian and French into Croatian. He is the only man who translated the complete works of William Shakespeare into Croatian. His translation of Rabelais' Gargantua and Pantagruel earned him the grand prix of the French Academy. He wrote the first Croatian rhyming dictionary.

Life and works

He was born in the village of Studenci near Imotski. His mother was a traditional folk poet whose songs chronicled local events. The Croatian dialect spoken in Studenci was later used by Maras for his translation of the sonnets of Giuseppe Gioachino Belli, originally written in the Romanesco dialect.

Maras graduated mathematics and physics from the Faculty of Science, University of Zagreb. He tried many careers, from geophysics to teaching to being a cultural attaché in Croatian embassies in Paris and Washington, DC. His cultural work includes editorial positions in several publishing houses, presiding the Croatian Translators' Society, and being the editor-in-chief of the cultural station (Treći Program) of the Croatian Radio.

He has been translating from English, Italian and French since his student days. The authors he translated include Dante, Petrarch, Milton, Scott, Kipling, Proust and Frost. He was awarded the Prize of the Croatian Translators' Society for his translation of Woolf's Mrs Dalloway and the grand prix of the French Academy for translating Rabelais' Gargantua and Pantagruel. In 2019, he was awarded the Order of Danica Hrvatska with the Effigy of Marko Marulić by the President of Croatia for outstanding work in translation and versatile contribution to the development of Croatian culture and its international reputation.

Maras was awarded an honorary doctorate from the Faculty of Philosophy of the University of Split in 2017.

Shakespeare

Maras is the only man who translated the complete works of William Shakespeare into Croatian. The translation was published in four volumes: Histories, Tragedies, Comedies, and Romances & Poetry (the last volume includes the problem plays).

The main novelty in relation to the previous Croatian translations is the verse translating method. A recurrent problem in the history of Shakespeare's translations in Croatia was the Croatian equivalent for the original blank verse. The usual practice was to choose a meter with a certain number of feet and stick to it, verse after verse. But its drawback was a rigid structure that often distorted the original, since it was usually too short to retain the full meaning of the original verse.

Instead of slavishly following a specific meter, Maras decided to remain as faithful as possible to the original meaning. For that reason, he introduced the principle of five "prominent points" in each verse. In fact, those were five relevant pieces of information from each original verse, to be translated in a poetic and rhythmic language akin to free verse, achieving an unprecedented fluent and natural flow of Shakespeare's plays in Croatian.

Own works

Maras published a collection of his own poetry, Kasna berba (A Late Vintage), in 2005. He wrote Grgur Ninski, a film script/history play about the medieval Croatian bishop Gregory of Nin, which was published in 2013.

In 2013, he wrote a novel about his emigrant father, Pisma od smrti (Letters From Death), "a monument to a life sacrificed in vain for vague ideals." When he published a collection of his mother's letters, Maras called it Pisma od života (Letters From Life).

He wrote the first Croatian rhyming dictionary.

Major translations

From English 
Beowulf, Zagreb, 2001
William Shakespeare, Complete Works, Zagreb, 2006-2008
John Milton, Paradise Lost, Zagreb, 2013
Walter Scott, Ivanhoe, Zagreb, 1987, 2000, 2004
Thomas de Quincey, Confessions of an Opium Eater, Zagreb, 1987, Koprivnica, 2003
Rudyard Kipling, The Jungle Book, Zagreb, 2004
Virginia Woolf, Mrs Dalloway, Zagreb, 1981
Thomas Wolfe, Look Homeward, Angel, Zagreb, 1978
Dashiell Hammett, The Maltese Falcon, Koprivnica, 2003
Robert Frost, Chosen Poems, Zagreb, 2006
Doris Lessing, The Golden Notebook, Zagreb, 1983; Memoirs of a Survivor, Zagreb, 1985
Barbara Tuchman, A Distant Mirror, Zagreb, 1984
Robert M. Pirsig, Zen and the Art of Motorcycle Maintenance, Zagreb, 1982
Haruki Murakami, Kafka on the Shore, Zagreb, 2009
Vladimir Nabokov, Pale Fire, Zagreb, 2011
Robert Browning, Selected Poems, Zagreb, 2018
Alfred Tennyson, In Memoriam A.H.H., Zagreb, 2019

From French 
The Song of Roland, Zagreb, 2015
Marie de France, Lais, Zagreb, 1999
François Rabelais, Gargantua and Pantagruel, Zagreb, 2004
Marcel Proust, Swann's Way, Zagreb, 2004

From Italian 
Guido Cavalcanti, Poems, Banja Luka, 1986, Zagreb, 1998
Dante Alighieri, The Divine Comedy (Paradise XVIII-XXXIII), Zagreb, 1976, 2004
Francesco Petrarca, Poems (with others), Zagreb, 1974
Giovanni Boccaccio, Decameron (with Jerka Belan), Zagreb, 1981, 1999, 2004
Jacopo Sannazaro, Arcadia, Zagreb, 2015
Niccolò Machiavelli, Firentine Histories, Zagreb, 1985; Correspondence, Zagreb, 1987
Giordano Bruno, Optimism of Free Thought (sonnets), Zagreb, 1985
Giuseppe Gioachino Belli, Sonnets, Zagreb, 1994 
Alberto Fortis, Voyage to Dalmatia, Zagreb, 1985, Split, 2004
Gabriele D'Annunzio, Giovanni Episcopo, Zagreb, 2004
Italo Svevo, The Conscience of Zeno, Zagreb, 1982
Giuseppe Tomasi di Lampedusa, The Leopard, Zagreb, 1982

From Spanish 
Cantar de mio Cid, Zagreb, 2018

From Romanian 
Mihai Eminescu, The Evening Star, Zagreb, 1995; Selected Poems, Zagreb, 2014

Awards 
 Prize of the Croatian Translators' Society for translating Mrs Dalloway.
 Grand Prix of the French Academy for translating Gargantua and Pantagruel.
 Iso Velikanović Award (2007) for translating Shakespeare's works and the lifetime award (2019).
 2009 Award of the City of Zagreb for his translation opus.
 Official recognition of the State of Romania in 2012 for translating Eminescu and Geo Bogza.
 2014 Kiklop Translator of the Year Award for translating Paradise Lost.
 2014 Josip Tabak Award for life's work.
 Lauro Dantesco award for his translation of Dante.
 Order of Danica Hrvatska with the Effigy of Marko Marulić (2019)

References 

Croatian translators
English–Croatian translators
French–Croatian translators
Italian–Croatian translators
Translators from Romanian
1939 births
Living people
People from Imotski